Singapore-style noodles is a dish of stir-fried cooked rice vermicelli, curry powder, vegetables, scrambled eggs and meat, most commonly chicken, beef, char siu pork, or prawns. Singapore noodles are a Cantonese creation, and are very common in Cantonese-style and takeaway restaurants in Hong Kong.

The dish itself has no connection to Singapore where it is not known, although there is a similarly named stir-fried noodle dish known as Xingzhou mifen or Xing Chow bee hoon, where Xingzhou is a poetic name for Singapore, in neighbouring Malaysia.

See also
Char kway teow

References

External links
BBC Food recipe

Cantonese cuisine
Hong Kong cuisine
American Chinese cuisine
Fried noodles